Mary Olive McKean (August 10, 1915 – March 31, 2006), also known by her married name Olive Mucha, was an American competition swimmer and swimming coach. McKean represented the United States at the 1936 Summer Olympics in Berlin.  She won a bronze medal as a member of the third-place U.S. team in the 4×100-meter freestyle relay.  Individually, she finished sixth in the 100-meter freestyle. McKean won the AAU 100 m freestyle titles in 1934 and 1935.

During the 1968 Summer Olympics in Mexico City, she served as the assistant manager for the U.S. swimming team.  She also worked as the aquatics director of the Multnomah Athletics Club, and was the first woman selected to be the president of the Oregon Amateur Athletic Union.

See also
 List of Olympic medalists in swimming (women)

References

1915 births
2006 deaths
American female freestyle swimmers
Olympic bronze medalists for the United States in swimming
People from Chehalis, Washington
Swimmers at the 1936 Summer Olympics
Medalists at the 1936 Summer Olympics
People from Troutdale, Oregon
20th-century American women
21st-century American women